eZ Publish (pronounced "easy publish") is an open-source enterprise PHP content management system that was developed by the Norwegian company Ibexa. eZ Publish is freely available under the GNU GPL version 2 license, as well as under proprietary licenses that include commercial support. In 2015, eZ Systems introduced eZ Platform to replace eZ Publish with a more modern and future-proof solution.

Areas of use

eZ Publish supports the development of customized web applications. Typical applications range from brand sites, news sites and intranets to e-commerce, collaboration portals and iOS/Android apps. eZ Publish provides role-based multi-user access, multi-site management and multi-device delivery to desktops, tablets, phones and the Internet of Things (IoT) such as Smart TVs and digital kiosks.

The software is widely used in web applications of varying type and size worldwide.

Handling 

eZ Publish is managed via a Web browser, and additional local software is not necessary. It also features a rich-text editor that allows formatting content similar to a word processor. This enables content editing and contribution without HTML skills. Content management can also be done through the eZ Publish front-end.

Dual-licensing

The software is provided for free, and may be used and modified according to the GPL license. In addition, paid professional support is available with the eZ Publish Enterprise Edition. Furthermore, a commercial license is also available, granting the right to use eZ Publish under license conditions different from the GPL.

Functional range 

The eZ Publish range of features includes professional and secure development of web applications. Functional areas include content versioning, media library, role-based rights management, mobile development, sitemaps, search and printing.

Additionally, the system includes extensions, which contain individual functions. This allows for the upgrading of components while preserving compatibility with customized parts.

Technology 

eZ Publish is written in PHP. Certified webservers on *nix systems are Apache and nginx. Some alternatives, such as Lighttpd, Hiawatha, Cherokee, may also work. On Windows, IIS is the preferred webserver. It is very common to use Varnish for caching high-performance sites that use eZ Publish.

The database abstraction layer enables the use of most common databases, i.e. MySQL, PostgreSQL, Microsoft SQL Server, and Oracle, without changes to the core system, by using drivers.

The software is cluster-ready and enforces the separation of content and presentation via XML storage of all content.

eZ Publish features:
 User defined content classes and objects
 Role based permissions system
 Template engine
 Version control
 Workflow management and task system
 Image conversion and scaling
 Database abstraction layer
 Multi-lingual support, with Unicode
 Libraries for XML, SOAP, localization and internationalization
 Search engine support

eZ Components 

eZ Components was a library of standardized modules for speeding up application development. It includes functions for compressing binary files, optimizing performance through caching, connecting to several databases, debugging, RSS, generating graphs for analysis, converting images, supporting email and validating user input.

In an effort to transition the development from a company-driven to a community-driven model, the whole source of the eZ Components were donated to the Apache Software Foundation, relicensed from the BSD to the Apache 2 license and renamed to Zeta Components.

Replacement with eZ Platform 
In December 2014 the last version of the eZ Publish software was released. The work on the code base continued in the form of eZ Platform. This new version is dropping all the legacy code from the software and transitioning to a complete new code base built on the Symfony Full Stack Framework. This allows the developer team to share components and documentation with the underlying framework, while adding functionalities such as content and media management. eZ Platform is one of many CMSs using Symfony PHP components.

The initial version of eZ Platform was released on December 15, 2015 and the latest stable version, v2.5, was released in March 2019. The product is a fully functional Open Source CMS. Beyond the open source version of the software, users have also the option to choose eZ Platform Enterprise Edition which is a commercial Digital Experience Platform built on the eZ Platform core.

Further reading

References

External links

 

Free content management systems